Attambelos III of Characene was a king of Characene who ruled from approximately 37/38 to 44/45AD. His rule is known only by the coins he minted.  The presence of these coins as far afield as Oman and southern Arabia indicates that his rule saw a time of extensive trade.

He was succeeded by Theonesios II.

References

Year of birth missing
1st-century deaths
1st-century monarchs in the Middle East
Kings of Characene
Year of death missing